Braintree, officially the Town of Braintree, is a municipality in Norfolk County, Massachusetts, United States. Although officially known as a town, Braintree is a city, with a mayor-council form of government, and is considered a city under Massachusetts law. The population was 39,143 at the 2020 census. The city is part of the Greater Boston area with access to the MBTA Red Line, and is a member of the Metropolitan Area Planning Council's South Shore Coalition. The first mayor of Braintree was Joe Sullivan who served until January 2020.  The current mayor of Braintree is Charles Kokoros.

Braintree, Massachusetts, is named after Braintree, Essex, in England.  The town was first chartered in 1640. Later, some sections of Braintree formed separate municipalities: Quincy (1792), Randolph (1793), and Holbrook (1872).

History 
European settlers first arrived in 1625. Subsequent to their arrival, the town was colonized in 1635, and ultimately incorporated in 1640. The town is named after the Essex town of Braintree. In addition to its present boundaries, it comprised land that was later split off into the separate municipalities of Quincy (incorporated in 1792), Randolph (1793), and Holbrook (1872).  Braintree was part of Suffolk County until the formation of Norfolk County in 1793.

The town of Braintree is the birthplace of several prominent figures in American history: Abigail Adams, founding father and 2nd president John Adams and president John Quincy Adams, statesman John Hancock, and General Sylvanus Thayer, an early superintendent of the United States Military Academy located at West Point, New York.

In 1920, Braintree was the site of the murders that led to the trial of Sacco and Vanzetti.  During that same decade, the town's population grew by more than 50%.

In January 2008, Braintree converted from a representative town meeting form of government to a mayor-council government.

Geography
Braintree shares borders with Quincy to the north, Randolph to the west (separated by the Cochato River), Holbrook to the south, and Weymouth to the east.

According to the U.S. Census Bureau, the town has a total area of 14.5 square miles (37.6 km2), of which 13.9 square miles (36.0 km2) is land and 0.6 sq mi (1.6 km2) is water. The total area is 4.34% water

Park and recreation locations in Braintree include Pond Meadow Park, Sunset Lake, and Blue Hills Reservation.

Climate 

Braintree has a humid continental climate (Köppen Dfb) with some maritime influence. Summers are typically warm to hot, rainy, and humid, while winters oscillate between periods of cold rain and snow, with cold temperatures. Spring and fall are usually mild, with varying conditions dependent on wind direction and jet stream positioning. Prevailing wind patterns that blow offshore minimize the influence of the Atlantic Ocean.

Periods exceeding  in summer and below freezing in winter are not uncommon but are rarely extended, with about 13 and 25 days per year seeing each, respectively. The city's average window for freezing temperatures is November 9 through April 5.

Braintree's coastal location on the North Atlantic moderates its temperature, but makes the city very prone to nor'easter weather systems that can produce much snow and rain. Snowfall increases dramatically as one goes inland away from the city (especially north and west of the city)—away from the moderating influence of the ocean.

Most snowfall occurs from December through March, as most years see no measurable snow in April and November, and snow is rare in May and October.

Fog is fairly common, particularly in spring and early summer, and the occasional tropical storm or hurricane can threaten the region, especially in late summer and early autumn. The last such storm to impact the city was Hurricane Sandy in October 2012. Due to its situation along the North Atlantic, the city is often subjected to sea breezes, especially in the late spring, when water temperatures are still quite cold and temperatures at the coast can be more than  colder than locations a few miles inland, sometimes dropping by that amount near midday.

Thunderstorms occur from May to September and are occasionally severe, with large hail, damaging winds and heavy downpours. Although Braintree has never been struck by a violent tornado, the city has experienced many tornado warnings. Damaging storms are more common in areas north, west, and northwest of the city.

Demographics

As of the census of 2000, there were 33,828 people, 12,652 households, and 8,907 families residing in the town. The racial makeup of the town was 93.96% White, 1.18% Black or African American, 0.11% Native American, 3.14% Asian, 0.03% Pacific Islander, 0.64% from other races, and 0.95% from two or more races. Hispanic or Latino people of any race were 1.16% of the population. More than 46% of town residents had Irish ancestry. As of 2014 Braintree had the 2nd highest concentration of Irish Americans in the entire country, slightly behind Scituate, Massachusetts.

There were 12,652 households, out of which 29.6% had children under the age of 18 living with them, 55.4% were married couples living together, 11.7% had a female householder with no husband present, and 29.6% were non-families. 24.4% of all households were made up of individuals, and 11.9% had someone living alone who was 65 years of age or older.  The average household size was 2.61 and the average family size was 3.16.

In the town the population was spread out, with 22.5% under the age of 18, 6.5% from 18 to 24, 28.9% from 25 to 44, 24.0% from 45 to 64, and 18.1% who were 65 years of age or older.  The median age was 40 years. For every 100 females, there were 89.1 males.  For every 100 females age 18 and over, there were 84.4 males.

The median income for a household in the town was $85,590, and the median income for a family was $90,590 as of a 2007 estimate). Males had a median income of $89,607 versus $36,034 for females. The per capita income for the town was $28,683.  About 2.1% of families and 3.8% of the population were below the poverty line, including 4.6% of those under age 18 and 3.3% of those age 65 or over.

Sports 
Braintree High School participates in the Bay State Conference, a Division 1 conference in the Massachusetts Interscholastic Athletic Association. The girls' basketball team has won back-to-back state championships and finished 2014 undefeated. The Braintree High dance team competes at the regional and national stage. The Wamps baseball team won the Super Eight baseball tournament in 2015 over St. John's Preparatory School in their second-straight finals appearance.

Braintree American Little League plays at Michael F. Dunn Little League Complex located at Hollingsworth Park. East Braintree Little League plays at Watson Park.

The Braintree Athletic Complex is scheduled to be located at Braintree High School and will feature two ice hockey rinks, a basketball court, a multi-use court, a swimming pool and an indoor baseball diamond.

Education 
Braintree is home to various educational institutions, both private and public.

Public primary and secondary education 
Public education at the primary and secondary levels is managed by Braintree Public Schools (BPS), a system that includes one kindergarten center, six elementary schools, two middle schools and one high school.
Public high school
 Braintree High School

Public middle schools
 East Middle School
 South Middle School

Public elementary schools
 Flaherty Elementary School
 Highlands Elementary School
 Hollis Elementary School
 Liberty Elementary School
 Morrison Elementary School
 Ross Elementary School

Private and alternative education 
Private and alternative education institutions in Braintree include Thayer Academy, Archbishop Williams High School, and CATS Academy.

Infrastructure

Transportation
Braintree is situated in the Greater Boston Area, which has rail, air, and highway facilities. State Route 128 and Interstate 95 divide the region into inner and outer zones, which are connected by numerous "spokes" providing direct access to the airport, port, and intermodal facilities of Boston.

Principal highways in Braintree are Interstate 93 (which runs concurrently with U.S. 1) and Route 3, as well as 37, and 53. Entering Braintree from the north, I-93, Route 1, and Route 3 all run concurrently as the Southeast Expressway from Boston; in Braintree they diverge, with Route 3 heading south toward Cape Cod as the Pilgrims Highway, and I-93 and Route 1 heading west toward Route 128.

Commuter rail service to South Station, Boston, is available on the Middleboro & Plymouth lines from the Braintree Red Line/Commuter Rail Station located on Union Street. The CapeFLYER rail service from Boston to Hyannis as well as Buzzards Bay stations also stops at Braintree Station. The MBTA Red Line is accessible at the same location. Weekday rail service on the Greenbush Line started in late 2007 and is accessible from the Weymouth Landing/East Braintree station on Quincy Avenue. In July 2017, Massachusetts Governor Charlie Baker and other Baker administration transportation officials visited a construction project in the city to highlight $2.8 billion spent during Baker's administration on highway construction projects and improvements to bridges, intersections, and sidewalks. Freight Rail service is provided by Fore River Transportation Corporation, and CSX Transportation. 

From 1948 to 1968, the town was the home of Braintree Airport, a general aviation airport located near Great Pond that was used by civil defense officials and private pilots. The airport featured a  dirt runway and offered flight training. Residential development, proximity to the town's water supply, and a number of accidents led to its closure in 1968.

Water and Sewer
In 2020, Braintree, together with Randolph, and Holbrook, formed a regional drinking water supply agency, which is called the Tri-Town Water Board. Braintree operates its own water treatment plant while a second treatment plant serves the Randolph-Holbrook Joint Water Board.

Commerce

Braintree is home to several large companies, including Altra Industrial Motion, Greater Media, Haemonetics, and TopSource LLC.

From 1964 to 1991 Braintree was the home of a Valle's Steak House restaurant. The chain was an East Coast landmark that stretched from Maine to Florida. The  Braintree restaurant was the largest in the chain when it opened, and featured a dining room that sat 600 customers, banquet rooms that accommodated 1,000, parking for 700 cars, and two kitchens, one  used exclusively for banquets. The restaurant had over 150 employees. Max Bodner of Quincy was the original manager. One of the chain's busiest locations, it was capable of serving over 5,000 customers per day. The restaurant changed names several times after the Valle's corporation closed in 1991 and was eventually razed to make way for a Toyota dealership. Among the notable moments in the restaurant's history occurred in 1980 when then presidential candidate Ronald Reagan made a campaign speech at a South Shore Chamber of Commerce luncheon.

Points of interest 

 Blue Hills Reservation
 General Sylvanus Thayer Birthplace
 Hollingsworth Park
 Monatiquot River
 Pond Meadow Park
 South Shore Plaza
 Sunset Lake

Notable people 

 Abigail Adams, wife of President John Adams; mother of John Quincy Adams
 Henry Adams, original emigrant to the Americas
 Jeremy Adams, original emigrant to the Americas
 John Adams, second President of the United States; first Vice President of the United States; signer of the U.S. Declaration of Independence
 John Quincy Adams, diplomat, sixth President of the United States; member of the United States House of Representatives
 Joe Amorosino, reporter and sports director for WHDH-TV
 Amy Bishop, perpetrator of the University of Alabama in Huntsville shooting
 Oscar Florianus Bluemner, German-born American Modernist painter
 Jim Calhoun, former head coach of University of Connecticut men's basketball team
 Priscilla Chan, philanthropist and pediatrician; wife of Mark Zuckerberg
 Chris Doherty, musician and recording artist from the band Gang Green
 Adam Gaudette, NHL player
 Brian Gibbons, NHL player
 John Hancock, signer of the U.S. Declaration of Independence; fourth President of the Continental Congress; first and third Governor of the Commonwealth of Massachusetts; diplomat and statesman
 Henry Hope, member of the Dutch bankers Hope & Co.
 Tiffany Kelly, beauty pageant winner, Miss Massachusetts of 2006
 Peter Kormann, gymnast and winner of the bronze medal in men's floor competition at the 1976 Olympics
 Don McKenney, hockey center; captain of the Boston Bruins, 1954–1963
 Jose Offerman, baseball player for the Boston Red Sox
 Rufus Putnam, American Revolutionary War military officer
 William Rosenberg, creator of the Dunkin' Donuts restaurant chain
 Nick Santino, founding member of the American rock band A Rocket to the Moon
 Butch Stearns, sports anchorman; Chief Content Officer for the Pulse Network
 Sylvanus Thayer, superintendent of the U.S. Military Academy; called "the father of West Point"
 Mo Vaughn, baseball player for the Boston Red Sox
 Donnie Wahlberg, record producer, songwriter, singer, actor; founding member of the musical group New Kids on the Block
 Mark Wahlberg, film and television producer; Academy Award-nominated actor; former lead singer of Marky Mark and the Funky Bunch
 Thomas A. Watson, primary assistant of Alexander Graham Bell; assisted in invention of the telephone; founder of Fore River Shipyard

Filming locations 
 June 1969: Tell Me That You Love Me, Junie Moon, directed by Otto Preminger (sequence filmed at 710 West Street)
 October 2006: The Departed, directed by Martin Scorsese (sequence filmed in the Fore River Shipyard)
 April 2008: Paul Blart: Mall Cop, directed by Steve Carr (sequence filmed in the South Shore Plaza)
 September 2009: What Doesn't Kill You, directed by Brian Goodman (sequence filmed at the Mobil station on Elm Street)
 April 2016: Stronger, directed by David Gordon Green (sequence filmed at the Skyline Drive apartment complex)

References

 Dennehy, John A. "Images of America: Braintree." Arcadia Publishing, 2010.

External links

 Town of Braintree
 Braintree Historical Society

 
1625 establishments in Massachusetts
Cities in Massachusetts
Cities in Norfolk County, Massachusetts
Populated places established in 1625